"Start a Band" is a song written by Dallas Davidson, Ashley Gorley and Kelley Lovelace.  It was recorded as a duet by American country music artist  Brad Paisley and Australian country music artist Keith Urban for Paisley's sixth studio album Play. Released in September 2008 as the only single from that album, it is also one of only four non-instrumental tracks on the album. It is Paisley's 22nd entry on the Billboard country charts, and Urban's 18th and ranked number one on the US Hot Country Songs charts in 2009.

Content
"Start a Band" is one of only four non-instrumental tracks on Play. Both Paisley and Urban sing and play guitar on the song, which is a moderate up-tempo in which the narrators decide that they will start a band instead of pursuing more academical ventures. In the chorus, they suggest to others who are "living in a world that they don't understand" that they, too, should "find [themselves] a few good buddies and start a band". According to Great American Country, Paisley described the song to The Plain Dealer as "probably not what you think, in the sense that it's not a blazing-fast thing…It's more of a rockin' Eagles-style tune, like back when Joe Walsh and Don Felder would play those harmony parts."

In the album's liner notes, Paisley writes:
"People have been asking for years when Keith and I would do something like this. I am so honored to get to finally pick and sing with one of my favorite players in the world. I am so humbled by his talent."

Chart performance
The song reached number one on the US Hot Country Songs chart week of January 24, 2009, becoming Paisley's thirteenth number one song (and ninth consecutive), as well as Urban's ninth number one. The song was nominated for a Grammy Award for Best Country Collaboration With Vocals at the 52nd Grammy Awards.

Personnel
Brad Paisley - lead vocals, background vocals, electric guitar, acoustic guitar
Keith Urban - lead vocals, background vocals, electric guitar
Randle Currie - steel guitar
Eric Darken - percussion
Wes Hightower - background vocals
Gary Hooker - acoustic guitar
Kenny Lewis - bass guitar
Ben Sesar - drums
Justin Williamson - fiddle

Charts

Weekly charts

Year-end charts

References

2008 singles
2008 songs
Brad Paisley songs
Keith Urban songs
Male vocal duets
Songs written by Kelley Lovelace
Songs written by Dallas Davidson
Songs written by Ashley Gorley
Song recordings produced by Frank Rogers (record producer)
Arista Nashville singles